Anthony V. Ardizzone (born 1949 in Chicago, Illinois, United States) is an American novelist, short story writer, and editor.

Biography
Ardizzone was raised on the North Side of Chicago. He graduated from the University of Illinois at Urbana–Champaign, in 1971 and from Bowling Green State University with an MFA in 1975. In 1973 he also did a year of study at the University of Illinois at Chicago

He taught at Saint Mary's Center for Learning (Chicago), Bowling Green State University, Old Dominion University, and Vermont College of Norwich University. In 1985, he taught at Mohammed V University in Rabat, Morocco. His work appeared in Ploughshares.

He served on the board of directors of the Association of Writers & Writing Programs.

 Ardizzone is a Chancellor's Professor in the MFA program at Indiana University, and lives in Bloomington, Indiana.

Awards
 1986 Flannery O'Connor Award for Short Fiction for The Evening News
 1992 Milkweed National Fiction Prize for Larabi's Ox: Stories of Morocco.
 1992 Chicago Foundation for Literature Award for Fiction for Larabi's Ox: Stories of Morocco.
 1986 Virginia Prize for Fiction, for Heart of the Order
 Lawrence Foundation Award
 Bruno Arcudi Literature Prize
 Prairie Schooner Readers' Choice Award
 Black Warrior Review Literary Award in Fiction
 Cream City Review Editors' Award in Nonfiction
 National Endowment for the Arts Fellowship

Novels
 The Whale Chaser (Academy Chicago Publishers, 2010) 
 In the Garden of Papa Santuzzu (Picador USA/St. Martin's Press, 1999)  (trade paperback edition 2000 MacMillan)
 Heart of the Order (Henry Holt and Company, 1986) 
 In the Name of the Father (novel) (Doubleday & Company, 1978)

Short story collections
 Taking it Home: Stories from the Neighborhood (The University of Illinois Press, 1996) 
 Larabi's Ox: Stories of Morocco (Milkweed Editions, 1992) 
 The Evening News (stories) (University of Georgia Press, 1986) 
[http://www.bu.edu/agni/fiction/print/1999/49-ardizzone.html "Cavaduzzo’s of Cicero", AGNI, 1999]

Anthologies

Editor

 
 Intro 11 (anthology of fiction and poetry)''. Norfolk: Associated Writing Programs, 1980.

The "Waxing the Floor Metaphor"
In addition to his extensive work as a creative writing instructor, Tony Ardizzone is widely acknowledged to be the originator of the "Wax The Floor Metaphor" for fiction writing, a well-known model for the drafting process of a literary work.  Ardizzone's model differs from others' in key ways (certain imagery and performative embellishments used) but is considered by many to be the purest, most authentic version. The metaphor essentially advises students of creative writing to work in stages of complete drafts from beginning to end.  Just as it would be ill-advised for a janitor to sweep, mop, wax and buff a single square of a tile floor before moving on to the next and repeating the process, students are warned with this model not to spend time editing and polishing individual paragraphs and chapters before the first draft has been completed and "the entire picture laid out," as novelist John Updike once put it.

References

External links
"Tony Ardizzone", Indiana University

1949 births
Living people
20th-century American novelists
20th-century American male writers
21st-century American novelists
American male novelists
Bowling Green State University alumni
Bowling Green State University faculty
Indiana University faculty
Academic staff of Mohammed V University
Old Dominion University faculty
University of Illinois Urbana-Champaign alumni
Writers from Chicago
21st-century American male writers
Novelists from Illinois
Novelists from Virginia
Novelists from Indiana
Novelists from Ohio